Shania: Still the One was a concert residency by Canadian singer-songwriter Shania Twain, performed at The Colosseum at Caesars Palace in Las Vegas, Nevada. The show began on December 1, 2012, and ended on December 13, 2014, with Twain performing more than 100 times.

Shania: Still the One was created by Twain, produced by AEG Live and directed by Raj Kapoor. The purpose of the show is to "take fans on a spectacular journey through the various stages of Shania's life and career in an unforgettable evening filled with music, multi-sensory and visual experiences, fashion and the unexpected".

Background
In 1993, Twain released her eponymous debut studio album, which caught the attention of record producer Robert John "Mutt" Lange. The two collaborated on songwriting via phone calls for six months, and later established a romantic relationship. Soon after, they wedded in December 1993 and Twain's second studio album The Woman in Me (1995) established Twain as a superstar, selling over 12 million copies in the United States. Twain and Lange continued to collaborate on her subsequent albums Come on Over (1997) and Up! (2002); the prior went on to sell over 40 million copies worldwide and became the best-selling album by a female artist. After selling a total of over 75 million records worldwide, making her the top-selling female artist in country music history,
Twain decided to take a musical hiatus in 2005. In 2008, it was announced that after 14 years of marriage, Twain and Lange were in the process of divorcing. The singer later said she had discovered her husband's infidelity with her best friend Marie Anne Thiebaud, although Lange and Thiebaud have never admitted to it. The divorce was finalized on June 9, 2010.

According to Twain, she became depressed and lost her desire to live following the divorce. As a distraction from it, Twain commenced to write her memoir From This Moment On (titled after the 1998 song of the same name). She then began to re-evaluate her life and noted a pattern of attempting to withhold emotions, which affected her voice (for both speaking and singing). She explained the loss of her voice was attributed to a cumulative stress that began with domestic violence in her childhood, continued with the death of her parents and the stress from her musical career, and finally exploded with the divorce. As a result, the singer developed dysphonia, an impairment in the ability to produce voice sounds using the vocal organs as a result of tightened muscles enveloping her voice box. In order to recover her voice and heal wounds caused by the divorce, Twain embarked on a documented journey with the series Why Not? with Shania Twain. The goal was executed via Twain performing acts out her comfort zone to once again be able to perform, while inspiring viewers to be proactive about their dilemmas.

Twain wrote the song "Today Is Your Day" for self-inspiration, during the development of Why Not? with Shania Twain. The song premiered on OWN: Oprah Winfrey Network on June 12, 2011, immediately after the broadcast premiere of Why Not? with Shania Twains final episode, "Endless Love". Subsequently, on the same night, "Today Is Your Day" was released to country radio and digital retailers in Canada and the United States, with an international release the next day. It became her first song release since "Shoes" (2005) from the Desperate Housewives soundtrack, and her first solo-written song released since "Leaving Is the Only Way Out" from The Woman in Me (1995).

Development

Having last performed live in July 2004 during her Up! Tour, Twain announced the Vegas residency on June 8, 2011. During a press conference announcing the show, she said that she will "let [her] imagination run wild" and that she is "going to go nuts creatively" for the show. She revealed that: "It's been a healing year, I've learned how to commit myself and put that into healing, instead of fear and anxiety, which is a big turnaround".

The show was created by Twain, produced by AEG Live and directed by Raj Kapoor. The purpose of the show is to "take fans on a spectacular journey through the various stages of Shania's life and career in an unforgettable evening filled with music, multi-sensory and visual experiences, fashion and the unexpected". Kapoor revealed that: "Shania wants her fans to share her spirit and passion in 4D and this show will capture the essence, soul and inspirations of Shania and her timeless music and lyrics brought to life with extraordinary beauty and powerfully intense visuals. Shania's creative world will be an immersive fusion of music, fantasy, spectacle and the fragile beauty of nature all brought together in a night of unforgettable entertainment."

Of getting over her vocal dysphonia, Twain told Las Vegas Weekly: "I am being very conscientious. I take a lot of steam showers, and [former Colosseum headliner] Bette Midler has recommended some [throat] sprays. Everybody has given me their little tips, and I'm just being very careful. I take good care of myself."

Commercial response
The show became a box office hit grossing over $43 million from a total of 346,021 sold tickets during the two-year run.

Set list
The following set list is representative of the show's opening night on December 1, 2012. It is not representative of all concerts for the duration of the residency.
 "I'm Gonna Getcha Good!"
 "You Win My Love"
 "Don't Be Stupid (You Know I Love You)"
 "Up!"
 "I Ain't No Quitter"
 "No One Needs to Know"
 "Whose Bed Have Your Boots Been Under?"
 "Any Man of Mine"
 "That Don't Impress Me Much"
 "Honey, I'm Home"
 "(If You're Not in It for Love) I'm Outta Here!"
 "Carrie Anne" 
 "Come On Over" (Acoustic)
 "Love Gets Me Every Time" (Acoustic)
 "Rock This Country!" (Acoustic)
 "Today Is Your Day" (Acoustic)
 "You're Still the One"
 "From This Moment On"
"Man! I Feel Like a Woman!"

Shows

Cancelled shows

Personnel
Show Creator / Executive Producer – Shania Twain
Show Director – Raj Kapoor
Production Designer – Michael Cotten
Costumier – Marc Bouwer
Lighting Designer – Peter Morse
Source:

Releases
On March 3, 2015, Shania Twain released Still the One: Live from Vegas. The set includes the entirety of the Shania: Still the One live concert and a 19 track live album.

References

External links

See also 

 Let's Go!

Concert residencies in the Las Vegas Valley
2012 concert residencies
2013 concert residencies
2014 concert residencies
Shania Twain concert tours
Caesars Palace